Number 57 Squadron, also known as No. LVII Squadron, is a Royal Air Force flying training squadron, operating the Grob Prefect T1 from RAF Cranwell, Lincolnshire.

History

First World War
No. 57 Squadron of the Royal Flying Corps was formed from on 8 June 1916 at Copmanthorpe, Yorkshire when it was split off from No. 33 Squadron, taking on its parent unit's part-time training role to allow No. 33 Squadron to concentrate on its main duties as a night fighter unit. No. 57 Squadron continued in its training role, equipped with a mixture of Avro 504s and Royal Aircraft Factory B.E.2s, until October that year, when it began to prepare for its planned role as a fighter-reconnaissance squadron, receiving Royal Aircraft Factory F.E.2d two-seat pusher biplanes in November.

On 16 December 1916, the squadron arrived at St. André-aux-Bois in France, moving to Fienvillers on 22 January 1917. By April 1917 the F.E.2d was obsolete, and the squadron suffered heavy losses supporting the British offensive at Arras. Examples included the loss of five F.E.2s in combat with a formation of German two-seaters on 6 April and the shooting down of three F.E.2s from a formation of seven by a group of 20 German fighters. The squadron re-equipped with more modern Airco DH.4s in May 1917, changing role to long-range bomber-reconnaissance. After training on the new type, the squadron commenced operations near Ypres in June of that year, moving to Droglandt on 12 June and Boisdinghem on 27 June. The squadron joined the 27th Wing, part of the V Brigade Royal Flying Corps, to support the British Army at the Ypres Offensive. The squadron's activities included bombing railway junctions and German airfields during the Battle of Langemarck in August 1917 and reconnaissance duties during the Battle of the Menin Road Ridge in September.

The squadron was deployed against the German spring offensive of 1918, attacking railway targets, taking part in both low- and high-level attacks to try to stem the German advance. From August 1918, the squadron carried out operations in support of the series of Allied offensives against the Germans that became known as the Hundred Days Offensive.
 
It was one of the few bomber units to produce flying aces, having five on strength. William Edward Green scored nine wins, and Forde Leathley eight, E. Grahame Joy seven with the squadron, and Arthur Thomas Drinkwater scored six, all in Airco DH.4s. In total, the squadron claimed 166 German aircraft during the war, dropping 285 tons of bombs and taking 22,030 photos.

Following the Armistice in November 1918 the squadron was assigned to mail carrying duties before returning to the UK in August 1919. It was based at RAF South Carlton from 4 August 1919 as a cadre before being disbanded on 31 December 1919.

Between the Wars
The squadron re-formed at RAF Netheravon on 20 October 1931 equipped with the Hawker Hart single-engined light bomber. It moved to RAF Upper Heyford on 5 September 1932. In 1933, No. 57 Squadron took part in the annual RAF Air Display at RAF Hendon, and together with No. 18 Squadron and No. 33 Squadron, demonstrated a formation takeoff by a three-squadron light bomber wing, repeating this display (this time in conjunction with No. XV Squadron and No. 18 Squadron) at the 1935 show. Another highlight was participation in the Royal Review of the RAF by King George V at RAF Mildenhall and RAF Duxford on 6 July 1935. The squadron started to receive the Hawker Hind, an improved development of the Hart, in March 1936, replacing the Hart by May 1936. On 1 May 1936, the squadron joined the newly established No. 1 Group, which became part of RAF Bomber Command on 14 July 1936. The squadron re-equipped with Bristol Blenheim Mk I twin-engined monoplane bombers from March 1938, discarding its last Hinds in May that year. The squadron joined No. 2 Group on 1 January 1939, training for both anti-shipping missions and low-level close support operations.

Second World War

Following the outbreak of the Second World War the squadron moved to France as part of the Air Component of the British Expeditionary Force, operating from Roye/Amy from 24 September 1939 in the strategic reconnaissance role and moving to Rosières-en-Santerre on 18 October. Following the German invasion of May 1940, the squadron re-added bombing to its reconnaissance duties, but was forced to frequently change bases to avoid the German advance, moving to Poix on 17 May and Crécy-en-Ponthieu (the site of the Battle of Crécy in 1346) before evacuating to England on 21 May. After a brief stay at Wyton the squadron was tasked with carrying out anti-shipping strikes against the coast of Norway and moved to RAF Elgin in Scotland.

The squadron moved to Feltwell in November 1940 to re-equip with the Vickers Wellington medium bomber. In September 1942 the squadron moved to Scampton and converted to Avro Lancaster heavy bombers. This was followed by a move to East Kirkby in August 1943 from where it operated for the remainder of the war, until disbanding on 25 November 1945.

During the War the squadron flew 5151 operational sorties and lost 172 aircraft.

Early Cold War (1945–1957)
The squadron was re-formed on 26 November 1945 at RAF Elsham Wolds by the re-numbering of 103 Squadron; it operated the Lancaster I and II and the Avro Lincoln. On 2 December 1945 the squadron moved to RAF Scampton before moving to RAF Lindholme with the Lincolns, then moved again in October 1946 to RAF Waddington. In May 1951, the squadron moved to RAF Marham, Norfolk, where it converted to the Boeing Washington B.1. After converting it moved in June 1951 to RAF Waddington and in April 1952 to RAF Coningsby.

The Washingtons were retired in 1953 and the squadron re-equipped with the twin jet English Electric Canberra B.2 from May 1953. The following year the squadron moved to RAF Cottesmore, in February 1955 it moved to RAF Honington, Suffolk, and in November 1956 returned to RAF Coningsby. The squadron disbanded at Coningsby on 9 December 1957.

Handley Page Victor (1959–1986)

The squadron re-formed on 1 January 1959 at RAF Honington as part of the V bomber strategic nuclear force equipped with the Handley Page Victor B.1. In December 1965, the squadron moved to RAF Marham to take on the role of a tanker squadron with the Victor K.1 after the Vickers Valiant tanker fleet was withdrawn due to wing spar issues.

In June 1976, the squadron began to convert over to the Victor K.2. On 25 June 1979, No. LVII Squadron helped support McDonnell Douglas Phantom FGR.2 XV424 across the Atlantic on its flight to mark the 60th anniversary of the Transatlantic flight of Alcock and Brown.

In response to the Argentine invasion of the Falkland Islands on 2 April 1982, No. 57 Squadron, along with No. 55 Squadron, deployed to Wideawake Airfield, Ascension Island. The squadron went on to support the complex Operation Black Buck raids, which saw multiple extreme long-range missions launched against Port Stanley Airport, East Falkland, with Avro Vulcan B.2s in May and June 1982.

In March 1984, No. LVII Squadron sent a detachment of Victors to RAF Leuchars, Fife, to participate in Exercise Teamwork 84. In 1985, the squadron helped support Panavia Tornado GR.1s of No. 27 Squadron participate in the Strategic Air Command Bomb Competition. No. 57 Squadron disbanded at RAF Marham on 30 June 1986, due to the operations in the Falklands using up a lot of the Victor fleet's remaining flying hours.

Training unit (1992–present)

Lockheed Hercules (1992–2002)
The squadron number plate was assigned to the Lockheed C-130 Hercules training unit, then No. 242 Operational Conversion Unit, at RAF Lyneham on 1 June 1992 becoming No. 57 (Reserve) Squadron. The unit continued flying the Hercules until 14 March 2002 when the squadron disbanded.

Grob Tutor & Prefect (2008–present)
On 1 October 2008, the No. 57 (R) Squadron plate was assigned to No. 2 Squadron, 1 EFTS as an Elementary Flying Training squadron, at RAF Wyton flying the Grob Tutor T.1. The squadron was then moved to RAF Cranwell, Lincolnshire, as part of No. 3 Flying Training School in 2014.

On 1 February 2018, the RAF rescinded all squadron (Reserve) nameplates changing No. 57 (Reserve) Squadron to just No. 57 Squadron. In 2018, No. LVII Squadron converted over to the Grob Prefect T.1 as part of the UK Military Flying Training System contract. This sees student pilots from all three services undertake a 20-hour package before being streamed Fast Jet, Rotary or Multi-Engine (depending on service).

Aircraft operated

See also
Alfie Fripp, longest serving and last surviving British prisoner of war
List of Royal Air Force aircraft squadrons

Endnotes

References
 Bower, Michael J.F. 2 Group R.A.F.: A Complete History, 1936–1945. London: Faber and Faber, 1974. .
 Brookes, Andrew. Victor Units of the Cold War. Osprey Publishing, 2011. .
 Bruce, J.M. The Aeroplanes of the Royal Flying Corps (Military Wing). London: Putnam, 1982. .
 Falconer, Jonathan. Bomber Command Handbook 1939–1945. Sutton Publishing, 2003. .
 Franks, Norman; Guest, Russell; Alegi, Gregory. Above the War Fronts: the British Two-seater Bomber Pilot and Observer Aces, the British Two-seater Fighter Observer Aces, and the Belgian, Italian, Austro-Hungarian and Russian Fighter Aces, 1914–1918 Volume 4 of Fighting Airmen of WWI Series: Volume 4 of Air Aces of WWI. Grub Street, 1997. , .
 Halpenny, B.B. Action Stations: Wartime Military Airfields of Lincolnshire and the East Midlands v. 2. Cambridge, Cambridgeshire, Patrick Stephens Ltd, 1981. 
 Halley, James J. The Squadrons of the Royal Air Force. Tonbridge, Kent, UK: Air Britain (Historians), 1980. .
 Jefford, C G. RAF Squadron, first edition 1988, Airlife Publishing, UK, 
 Jones, H.A. The War in the Air: Volume III History of the Great War. Oxford: The Clarendon Press, 1931.
 Jones, H.A. The War in the Air: Volume IV History of the Great War. Oxford: The Clarendon Press, 1934. 
 Jones, H.A. The War in the Air: Volume V History of the Great War. Oxford: The Clarendon Press, 1935. 
 Jones, H.A. The War in the Air: Volume VI History of the Great War. Oxford: The Clarendon Press, 1937.
 Moyes, Phillip. Bomber Squadrons of the R.A.F. and their Aircraft. London: Macdonald, 1964. .
 Thetford, Owen. "By Day and by Night: Hawker Hart and Hind": Operational History Part One. Aeroplane Monthly, July 1995, Vol. 23, No. 7, pp. 50–57. .
 Thetford, Owen. "By Day and By Night: Hawker Hart and Hind". Operational History Part Two. Aeroplane Monthly. August 1995, Vol. 23, No. 8. pp. 34–43. ISSN 0143-7240.

External links

 57 Squadron (1916-date) detailed history website
 Bomber Command No. 57 Squadron
 Air of Authority – A History of RAF Organisation: No 56–60 Squadron Histories
 57 & 630 Squadrons' Association Website

Flight training in the United Kingdom
057
057
Military units and formations established in 1916
1916 establishments in the United Kingdom